Europejara is a genus of tapejarid pterosaur from the Early Cretaceous period of Spain. The type and only species known is Europejara olcadesorum.

Discovery and naming
 
In 2012, the type species Europejara olcadesorum was named and described by Romain Vullo, Jesús Marugán-Lobón, Alexander Kellner, Angela Buscalioni, Bernard Gomez, Montserrat de la Fuente and José Moratalla. The generic name combines the names of Europe and the related genus Tapejara, in reference to the fact that Europejara is the first tapejarid found in that continent. The specific name refers to the Olcades, the Celtiberic tribe inhabiting the region of Cuenca, the location of the find, in Antiquity.

The holotype, MCCM-LH 9413, was uncovered at the Las Hoyas site in a chalkstone layer of the Calizas de La Huergina Formation dating from the late Barremian. It consists of a partial skull with lower jaws, compressed on a slab and counterslab. Two elements of the hyoid are present also. The skull has been vertically crushed, the lower jaws horizontally. The specimen was prepared by Mercedes Llandres Serrano, and is part of the Las Hoyas collection of the Museo de las Ciencias de Castilla–La Mancha.

Description

The jaws are toothless and the lower jaws bear a large downwards pointing crest.

The describers established three autapomorphies, unique derived traits. The crest on the lower jaws is curved to the back. The crest is deeper than its base, measured from the front to the back, is wide. The crest is four times deeper than the back of the jaw. Two other diagnostic traits were indicated: the inner side of the lower jaw is thickened, causing a convex curvature; the inner side shows some shallow, but well-demarcated, depressions.

Due to the crushing of the skull, its fragments, mainly representing elements from the area around the right eye socket, show little detail. In their front parts the lower jaws are fused by a symphysis into a mandibula. The symphysis has a concave upper profile and features a large crest on the underside, pointing downwards for at least . The back edge of the crest is recurved; the curvature of the front edge cannot be exactly established because of damage. The crest is the longest relative to lower jaw length of any known pterosaur. The internal bone structure of the crest is spongy.

Phylogeny

Europejara was assigned to the Tapejaridae. A cladistic analysis showed it to be more precisely a member of the Tapejarinae. Apart from being the first tapejarid known from Europe, it would also be the oldest pterosaur with certainty known to be edentulous; older fragments have been reported representing other generally toothless clades but these did not include the jaws themselves. The cladogram below follows a phylogenetic analysis by Kellner, one of the describers of Europejara, and colleagues in 2019. They recovered Europejara within the tribe Tapejarini, sister taxon to three other genera: Caiuajara, Tapejara, and Tupandactylus.

Paleobiology
 
Following earlier suggestions about the diet of tapejarids, the describers assumed a frugivorous lifestyle for Europejara. Because the species is so old it indicates a role for the tapejarids in the Cretaceous Terrestrial Revolution, a turn-over in the ecosystems of the Lower Cretaceous in which gymnosperms were replaced by angiosperms, flowering plants, and new groups of herbivores evolved, adapted to the changed food supply. In the case of tapejarids there could have been a reinforcing interactive cycle between the evolution of fruit and the pterosaurs dispersing the seed. Possibly the beaks of the tapejarids had ragged edges forming pseudo-teeth to better separate the fruit flesh from the seeds, as with some extant toucans.

See also
 List of pterosaur genera
 Timeline of pterosaur research

References

Tapejaromorphs
Early Cretaceous pterosaurs of Europe
Cretaceous Spain
Fossils of Spain
La Huérguina Formation
Fossil taxa described in 2012
Taxa named by Alexander Kellner